Symmoca alhambrella is a moth of the family Autostichidae. It is found in Portugal and Spain.

The wingspan is 13.5–14 mm. The forewings are whitish cinereous, dusted and shaded with brownish fuscous. The hindwings are brownish fuscous.

References

Moths described in 1911
Symmoca